Rejlers is one of the largest engineering consultancy firms in the Nordic region. Rejlers has 2400 employees in technology areas such as energy, industry, infrastructure, real estate and telecom. Rejlers have representation in Sweden, Finland, Norway and the United Arab Emirates. In 2019, the company had a turnover of 2.6 billion SEK and its class B share is listed on Nasdaq Stockholm.

External links
 Company's website

Companies listed on Nasdaq Stockholm
Companies based in Stockholm
1942 establishments in Sweden
Technology companies established in 1942
Engineering consulting firms of Sweden
International engineering consulting firms
Consulting firms established in 1942